Babushkin, known as Mysovsk before 1941, is a town in Kabansky District of the Republic of Buryatia, Russia, located on the southern shore of Lake Baikal on the Trans-Siberian Railway. Population:    9,000 (1967).

History
It was founded in 1892 as a postal station Mysovaya, its name derived from the Russian word Mys meaning "cape", referring to its location on the shores of Lake Baikal.

A few years later it was chosen as the eastern terminus for the train ferry across Lake Baikal, which was used as part of the Trans-Siberian Railway until the rail line around the southern shore was completed in 1905. It was granted town status under the name Mysovsk in 1902.

It was renamed Babushkin in 1942, in honor of the revolutionary Ivan Babushkin, arrested and executed at Mysovaya station in 1906.

Administrative and municipal status
Within the framework of administrative divisions, it is, together with four rural localities, incorporated as the Town of Babushkin—an administrative division of Kabansky District. As a municipal division, the territory of Babushkin, together with two rural localities, is incorporated within Kabansky Municipal District as Babushkinskoye Urban Settlement. The remaining two rural localities are incorporated as Klyuyevskoye Rural Settlement of Kabansky Municipal District.

Economy
Babushkin is a depot for wood transport on the Trans-Siberian Railway, as well as a tourist center for tours on southern Lake Baikal.

References

Notes

Sources

External links
Official website of Babushkin 
Directory of organizations in Babushkin 

Cities and towns in Buryatia
Populated places in Kabansky District
Populated places on Lake Baikal